The men's 80 kg  competition in taekwondo at the 2004 Summer Olympics in Athens took place on August 28 at the Faliro Coastal Zone Olympic Complex.

Moving up to 12&nbspkg heavier than his weight in Sydney four years earlier, American taekwondo jin Steven López defied his odds to defeat Turkey's Bahri Tanrıkulu with a score 3–0 for his second Olympic gold. Iran's Yousef Karami rallied for a tight 9–8 victory over Azerbaijan's Rashad Ahmadov to grab the bronze medal.

Competition format
The main bracket consisted of a single elimination tournament, culminating in the gold medal match. The taekwondo fighters eliminated in earlier rounds by the two finalists of the main bracket advanced directly to the repechage tournament. These matches determined the bronze medal winner for the event.

Schedule
All times are Greece Standard Time (UTC+2)

Results
Legend
PTG — Won by points gap
KO — Won by knockout
SUP — Won by superiority
OT — Won on over time (Golden Point)
WO — Walkover

Main bracket

Repechage

References

External links
Official Report

Men's 080 kg
Men's events at the 2004 Summer Olympics